Paulo Macedo a Portuguese business manager and is the CEO of Caixa Geral de Depósitos since 2017. He was the Portuguese Health Minister from 2011 to 2015 and General Director of Taxes and Chairman of the Fiscal Administration Board (2004–2007).

Biography
Paulo Moita de Macedo was born on 14 July 1963. He holds a Degree in Corporate Organisation and Management, Instituto Superior de Economia e Gestão of Universidade de Lisboa (1986). PADE – Programa de Alta Direção de Empresas (Top Management Program), AESE (2003). Several Executive Formations (MIT, Harvard Business School, INSEAD, IMD) in several countries.

References

Health ministers of Portugal
Government ministers of Portugal
Living people
1963 births
People from Lisbon